Hurricane Frances was the second most intense tropical cyclone in the Atlantic during 2004 and proved to be very destructive in Florida. It was the sixth named storm, the fourth hurricane, and the third major hurricane of the 2004 Atlantic hurricane season. The system crossed the open Atlantic in late August, moving to the north of the Lesser Antilles while strengthening. Its outer bands struck Puerto Rico and the British Virgin Islands while passing north of the Caribbean Sea. As the system's forward motion slowed, the eye passed over San Salvador Island and very close to Cat Island in the Bahamas. Frances was the first hurricane to impact the entire Bahamian archipelago since 1928 and almost completely destroyed their agricultural economy.

Frances then passed over the central sections of Florida, three weeks after Hurricane Charley, causing significant damage to the state's citrus crop, closing major airports and schools, and forcing the cancellation of a collegiate football game. The storm then moved briefly offshore from Florida, into the northeast Gulf of Mexico, and made a second U.S. landfall, on the Florida Panhandle, before accelerating northeast through the eastern United States near the Appalachians and into Atlantic Canada while weakening. A significant tornado outbreak accompanied the storm across the eastern United States, nearly equaling the outbreak from Hurricane Beulah. Very heavy rains fell in association with this slow-moving and relatively large hurricane, which caused floods in Florida and North Carolina. 50 people died and damages totaled US$10.1 billion (2004 dollars).

Meteorological history

A strong tropical wave moved off the west coast of Africa on August 21. Moving under the base of the subtropical ridge, it moved westward for several days, remaining disorganized despite favorable conditions. Thunderstorms associated with the wave finally began organizing early on August 24 and the system became a tropical depression that evening.

The tropical storm, now named Frances, further intensified on August 26 in an environment of low vertical wind shear as its track bent to the west-northwest. Frances rapidly intensified, developing an eye and reaching hurricane strength late that afternoon. An approaching upper-level trough caused Frances to move more northwesterly on August 27. The hurricane turned back to its original westward motion on August 29, as the upper trough moved away the region and the subtropical ridge strengthened to Frances's north.

This weakening trend was short lived, and the storm reintensified during the afternoon of August 30, as vertical wind shear remained low. On September 2, Frances entered the Bahamas, passing directly over San Salvador Island and very close to Cat Island. The storm weakened to a Category 3 hurricane by 2 pm, which was initially attributed to inner core processes, but increasing westerly winds aloft, and the resultant vertical wind shear, was later determined to be the cause. On September 3, Frances passed into the vicinity of Abaco Island and directly over Grand Bahama while continuing to slowly weaken. The storm regained Category 2 hurricane intensity prior to passing over Grand Bahama Island and also slowed in forward speed due to a weakness in the subtropical ridge to its north. Parts of South Florida began to be affected by squalls and the outer rainbands of the hurricane at this time.

However, Frances remained stable at Category 2 intensity with  maximum sustained winds while it battered the east coast of Florida between Fort Pierce and West Palm Beach for much of September 4. At 11 pm, the western edge of the eyewall began moving onshore. At 1 am EDT on September 5 (0500 UTC), the center of the broad eye of Frances made landfall along the Florida coast, at the southern end of Hutchinson Island, near Sewall's Point, Jensen Beach, and Port Salerno, Florida. Late on September 5, Frances picked up speed due to a strengthening high pressure system to its north and crossed the Florida Peninsula, emerging over the Gulf of Mexico near Tampa as a tropical storm. After a short trip over the Gulf of Mexico, Frances made a second landfall near St. Marks, Florida. Frances headed inland, weakening to a tropical depression and causing heavy rainfall over the southern and eastern United States. As Tropical Depression Frances turned northeast, United States meteorologists at the Hydrometeorological Prediction Center continued issuing advisories on the system until it crossed the Canada–United States border into Quebec, where heavy rainfall also fell.

Preparations

A tropical storm watch was issued for Frances for the Leeward Islands during the afternoon of August 29, which was upgraded to a warning that night and expanded to include the islands of Anguilla, Antigua, Barbuda, Nevis, Saba, Saint Kitts, Sint Eustatius, and Sint Maarten. A hurricane watch was issued during the night of August 29 for the northern British Virgin Islands, the northern United States Virgin Islands, Culebra, and Vieques. On the morning of August 30, the hurricane watch for Vieques was downgraded to a tropical storm watch. That afternoon, hurricane watches were changed to tropical storm warnings across Puerto Rico, Culebra, Vieques, British Virgin Islands, and the northern U. S. Virgin Islands while a tropical storm watch was issued for St. Croix while all remaining hurricane watches were dropped. That night, tropical storm watches were issued for eastern portions of the northern coast of the Dominican Republic while a tropical storm warning was issued for Guadeloupe.

Early on the morning of August 31, tropical storm warnings were dropped for Antigua, Barbuda, Nevis, and St. Kitts while hurricane watches were issued for the southeast Bahamas as well as the Turks and Caicos Islands. Hurricane watches were upgraded to hurricane warnings later that morning. Toward noon, tropical storm warnings were issued for the remainder of the northern coast of the Dominican Republic, a hurricane watch was issued for the central Bahamas, while all watches and warnings were dropped for northeast portion of the Dominican Republic and portions of the Lesser Antilles south of the British Virgin Islands. That afternoon, tropical storm warnings were dropped from Puerto Rico eastward. On the morning of September 1, a hurricane watch was issued for the northwest Bahamas while the watch for the central Bahamas was upgraded to a warning. That afternoon, warnings were dropped for the Dominican Republic.

On the evening of September 1, hurricane warnings were issued for the northwest Bahamas while hurricane watches were issued for the lower east coast of Florida and tropical storm watches were issued for the Florida Keys. There was the potential for catastrophic damage along Florida's heavily populated east coast, with warnings that damages from Frances could exceed the insured losses of Hurricane Andrew. These damage estimates were in anticipation that Frances would strike Florida as a strong Category Four hurricane. Preparations for the storm were stepped up in Florida on September 1. Governor Jeb Bush declared a state of emergency, Kennedy Space Center closed down, and evacuations of 500,000 people were initially ordered. Eventually 41 counties received evacuation orders, covering 2.8 million residents, the largest evacuation in Florida's history. The state education system also responded to the pending crisis. Many universities across Florida canceled classes. Both the University of Central Florida and the University of North Florida told all students to leave their dorms. Evacuation at the University of South Florida was performed on a dorm-by-dorm basis. Florida Atlantic University was closed for a week and a half. Most schools were shut down from southern Miami-Dade County to just south of Melbourne two days before the hurricane. The annual Florida State University-University of Miami college football game was rescheduled for the following week.

Early during the morning of September 2, hurricane watches were extended southward to Craig Key. Later that morning, hurricane watches were upgraded to hurricane warnings for the lower east coast of Florida while a hurricane watch and tropical storm warning was raised for most of the Florida Keys and Florida Bay. Hurricane warnings were dropped for the Turks and Caicos Islands late on the morning of September 1 and for the Southeast Bahamas late that night. Late on the morning of September 3, hurricane watches were issued for the northeast coast of Florida, while early that afternoon tropical storm warnings were issued for the same area. Hurricane warnings were dropped for the central Bahamas that afternoon. That night, tropical storm warnings were issued for the southwest coast of the Florida peninsula with watches issued for the northwest Florida peninsula. On the morning of September 4, tropical storm warnings were extended northward to Anna Maria Island and along the Georgia coast. Tropical storm watches were extended northward to St. Marks, Florida. That afternoon, hurricane watches were dropped for most of the northwest Bahamas while warnings were extended up the coast to St. Marks, and watches were extended westward to Panama City, Florida.

Early on morning of September 5, hurricane warnings were downgraded to tropical storm warnings south of Deerfield Beach, Florida, while tropical storm warnings were extended westward through the western Florida Keys. Later that morning, hurricane warnings were issued for most of the northwest Florida coast while hurricane watches were lowered for northeast Florida and hurricane warnings were dropped for the remainder of the northwest Bahamas. That afternoon, all warnings were dropped for southeast Florida south of Jupiter Inlet, while the remaining hurricane warnings along the east Florida coast were downgraded to tropical storm warnings. Hurricane warnings along the coast of western Florida were extended southward to Anna Maria Island. Late that night, tropical storm warnings were dropped south of Bonita Beach including all the Florida Keys. Early on the morning of September 6, all warnings were dropped in Florida south of Englewood and Cocoa Beach. Later that morning, hurricane warnings were downgraded to tropical storm warnings between Indian Pass and Destin as well as between Anna Maria Island and the Suwannee River while all remaining warnings were dropped south of Anna Maria Island, as well as the Florida east coast and the Georgia coast. That afternoon, all hurricane warnings were downgraded to tropical storm warnings, with all warnings dropped between west of St. Marks and south of the Suwannee river. On the night of September 6, all remaining tropical cyclone warnings were dropped.

Impact

The economic effect was felt early, as the storm struck during Labor Day weekend, traditionally the final summer vacation weekend in the United States. Many hotel reservations from South Carolina to Florida were cancelled as people, seeing the destruction caused weeks earlier by Hurricane Charley, decided to avoid the coastal areas for safety. One death in the Bahamas, one in Ohio, and five in Florida were directly attributed to the storm. 42 more deaths - 32 in Florida, eight in Georgia, one in the Bahamas and one in Ohio, are indirectly attributed to Frances.

The total civilian damage from Frances was determined to be approximately US$8.86 billion (2004 dollars). Add in the estimated US$100 million damage (2004 dollars) done to space and military facilities at Kennedy Space Center, Cape Canaveral Air Force Station, and Patrick Air Force Base, Florida and the total damage was estimated to be about US$9 billion (2004 dollars), making it the fourth costliest hurricane in United States history at that time, behind Hurricane Andrew of 1992 and Hurricanes Charley and Ivan of 2004. At the time, adjusted for inflation, it became the seventh costliest hurricane for the lower 48 United States.  Flooding was also reported in Pittsburgh, Pennsylvania. Minor flooding happened along the banks of the three rivers and more damage was associated with river tributaries.

Bahamas

About 75% of the island chain lost power for a few hours during the storm. Damage occurred to downed trees and wooden homes. Between 13 and 17 percent of the non-native Australian pine on San Salvador Island experienced damage, primarily from snapping, though some browning from salt spray was noted. Several feet of water flooded the international airport at Freeport.
In the Bahamas, insurers and reinsurers estimated industry insured losses at about $300 million (2004 dollars). All cool-season vegetable plantings, and the entire banana crop, were lost during Frances. The pineapple crop was significantly impacted by wind damage in Eleuthera, while the entire fruit crop was lost for similar reasons. The corn crop in Long Island and Cat Island was completely lost. Significant poultry losses were experienced.

Florida

Near the point of its first landfall, few structures were destroyed and ocean overwash across the barrier island was limited, though the extent of the damage far exceeded that of Hurricane Charley. Wind damage to citrus groves led to a near total loss near the coast of east-central Florida between West Palm Beach and Melbourne, with lesser damage farther to the west across the Kissimmee River basin. Between Hurricane Charley and Frances, citrus losses totaled $2 billion (2004 dollars). Significant tree damage was reported within golf courses along the Treasure Coast, with an average of 300-500 trees experiencing damage per course.

Heavy rains caused a large sinkhole to develop on Interstate 95 in Palm Beach County, which closed the highway to traffic. Frances caused heavy damage to the large Vehicle Assembly Building at the Kennedy Space Center, ripping off 820 4-by-10 foot aluminum panels covering the building. While Charley caused $700,000 damage (2004 dollars), Frances's damage was significantly greater. Two external fuel tanks for the Space Shuttle were in the building but seemed undamaged. The Space Shuttle Discovery's hangar was without power. The total damage to space and military facilities around Cape Canaveral, Florida was reported at about $100 million (2004 dollars). Orlando, Florida's theme parks closed Sunday — only the third time Walt Disney World had closed for a hurricane, but the second time in a month. A wind gust of 70 mph was recorded at Orlando International Airport.

Georgia
Frances dropped significant rain on Florida, Georgia, Alabama, and North and South Carolina. At one point on September 7, a total of 380,000 residences were without power. Significant crop damage was seen, particularly to the cotton and the peanut crops. On average, 30 percent of the crops were lost during Frances.

Carolinas
Flooding was reported even in the mid-Atlantic and Northeast states, particularly along the Appalachian Mountains. Flooding along the Swannanoa River near Asheville, North Carolina caused a major break in Asheville's water distribution system, leaving the city without water for several days. The Pigeon River flooded in Haywood County, leaving many homeless and many businesses closed, including the town hall of Canton. Significant crop damage was seen into North Carolina, which reported $55 million in crop damage. Frances also spawned 101 tornadoes from Florida to as far north as Virginia, shy of the single storm tornado record set during Hurricane Beulah.
Power outages affected up to six million people. Over 20 airports closed during the storm.

Canada
As an extratropical cyclone, Frances passed through southern Ontario. This rainfall smashed all-time rainfall records in a 24-hour period (most of the rain fell in a 6 to 8 hour-period). Ottawa's O-Train Trillium Line was halted because of a landslide that obstructed the railroad corridor. Several major roads in Gatineau and Ottawa were under several inches of water, locally chest-high. More than $45 million (2004 CAD; US$41 million) in insured damage was reported in Ontario.

Aftermath

Bahamas
Frances is the first hurricane to impact the entire archipelago since 1866. On September 4, teams from the Ministry of Works, the Department of Environmental Health Services, the Royal Bahamas Defence Force and the Royal Bahamas Police Force were used to clear roadways of tree debris while utilities attempted to restore power and water in New Providence. The Family Islands were surveyed on September 5 and 6, when it was noted that major damage occurred within the island group. Telecommunications were restored to most of the island chain within 24 hours. As of September 21, electricity had been restored to half of the Bahamians who had lost power. Western sections of Grand Bahama Island remained without power into Hurricane Jeanne, which was the most significantly impacted island. The onion crop was expected to be late in 2005 due to the loss of seedbeds and seedlings during the storm.

Florida

In the aftermath of the storm, many colleges and school districts across Florida remained closed. President George W. Bush declared all of Florida a federal disaster area. Kennedy Space Center did not restore its complete work force until September 13 due to relief operations, as well as a lack of gasoline, ice, and water in the area. A total of 8000 members of the National Guard helped out with recovery efforts soon after the storm left the Florida peninsula. Residents in the areas of impact after the storm were under a boil water order, because of the lack of electricity to area water systems. Churches prepared meals for people without power and food. Federal employees were granted excused absences if they helped with law enforcement and the cleanup. Thousands of portable generators were sent to the state by Home Depot and Lowe's home improvement stores. The United States Army Corps of Engineers installed blue tarpaulins on 41,556 damaged roofs statewide. Damage to the Florida citrus crop caused orange futures to rise four cents a pound.

Georgia and the Carolinas
On September 24, the southern two-thirds of Georgia was declared a disaster by President Bush. The state lost 50 percent of its pecan crop due to Frances, which led to a price rise in pecans by late October. Lost peach trees were expected to lower output during 2005, and increase peach prices. A disaster declaration was made for the northeast section of South Carolina on October 7. On September 10, President Bush declared 34 counties within North Carolina a disaster area, making them eligible for US$6.5 million (2004 dollars) in public assistance. A Wildlife Commission removed its North Carolina Mountain State Fair exhibit due to Frances midway through the fair. Over 100,000 trout were lost due to the storm in the Pisgah, Table Rock, Marion, and Armstrong state fish hatcheries. Red Cross volunteers distributed over 200,000 gallons of water by its 600 volunteers in four days. After Frances and Hurricane Ivan, Asheville determined that it needed $14 million in order to buy out willing businesses and homes within the floodplain.

Retirement

Because of its effects in the United States, the name Frances was retired in the spring of 2005 by the World Meteorological Organization (WMO), and will never again be used for an Atlantic hurricane. It was replaced with Fiona for the 2010 season. Due to a request by France at the 2003 WMO meeting, the name Frances was already set to be removed from the rotating list after the 2004 hurricane season, regardless of any impact by the storm. However, the destruction caused by Frances in the United States was enough to justify its retirement in any case.

See also

 List of Florida hurricanes (2000-present)
 List of retired Atlantic hurricane names
 Hurricane Frances tornado outbreak
 List of Category 4 Atlantic hurricanes

References

External links

 
 NHC advisory archive on Hurricane Frances
 HPC rainfall report on Frances
 State of Florida - Hurricane Frances preparedness

Frances
Frances (2004)
Frances
Frances
F3 tornadoes
Frances
Frances
Frances
Frances
Frances
Frances
2004 natural disasters
2004 natural disasters in the United States
August 2004 events in North America
September 2004 events in North America
Frances